Arturo Rivarola (born November 2, 1989) is a Paraguayan rower. He placed 24th in the men's single sculls event at the 2016 Summer Olympics.

References

1989 births
Living people
Paraguayan male rowers
Olympic rowers of Paraguay
Rowers at the 2016 Summer Olympics
Rowers at the 2015 Pan American Games
Rowers at the 2019 Pan American Games
Pan American Games competitors for Paraguay
Competitors at the 2022 South American Games
21st-century Paraguayan people